Poupatempo is a project created and implemented by the São Paulo State government, during the administration of Mário Covas, in 1996. The service offers in one place more than 400 services related to official documents, from the emission of ID Cards and Driver's License, to Employment record books, among others. Currently, there are 100 facilities across the state of São Paulo. The program also has online services starting in 2020, currently offering 184 services on the official website or smartphone app.

In 2015, a survey showed 97% of the users of the program approved of the service given in the facilities.

In October 2016, started being distributed self-service totems across the state in places like Shopping Centers, Supermarkets, Metro and Train stations, among others. These totems serve basic functions, like printing basic documents and scheduling services in the program's facilities. Currently, there are 34 such totems across the state.

With the opening of the Junqueirópolis Poupatempo, in December 2021, the program crossed the mark of 100 fixed facilities across the state.

Facilities 

 Capital

 Alesp
 Cidade Ademar
 Itaquera
 Lapa
 Santo Amaro
 Sé

 
 Greater São Paulo

 Caieiras
 Carapicuíba
 Cotia
 Diadema
 Ferraz de Vasconcelos
 Franco da Rocha
 Guarulhos
 Itaquaquecetuba
 Mauá
 Mogi das Cruzes
 Osasco
 Santo André
 São Bernardo do Campo
 Suzano
 Taboão da Serra

 Coastal

 Caraguatatuba
 Guarujá
 Praia Grande
 Santos
 São Vicente
 Ubatuba

 
 Inner State

 Aguaí
 Americana
 Andradina
 Araçatuba
 Araraquara
 Araras
 Assis
 Atibaia
 Avaré
 Barretos
 Bauru
 Bebedouro
 Birigui
 Boituva
 Botucatu
 Bragança Paulista
 Caçapava
 Campinas Shopping
 Capão Bonito
 Catanduva
 Cerquilho
 Dracena
 Fernandópolis
 Franca
 Guaratinguetá
 Hortolândia
 Ibaté
 Ibitinga
 Indaiatuba
 Itapetininga
 Itapeva
 Itatiba
 Itatinga
 Itu
 Jacareí
 Jahu
 Jales
 Jundiaí
 Junqueirópolis
 Lençóis Paulista
 Limeira
 Lins
 Lorena
 Marília
 Matão
 Mococa
 Mogi Guaçu
 Neves Paulista
 Ourinhos
 Penápolis
 Pindamonhangaba
 Piquete
 Piracicaba
 Porto Ferreira
 Presidente Prudente
 Registro
 Ribeirão Preto
 Rio Claro
 Salto
 Santa Bárbara d'Oeste
 São Carlos
 São João da Boa Vista
 São José do Rio Preto
 São José dos Campos
 Serra Negra
 Sertãozinho
 Sorocaba
 Sumaré
 Tatuí
 Taubaté
 Tupã
 VotuporangaNote: Informations recovered from the official website.

Scheduling 
In light of the growing demand for services, the administration of the program instituted a scheduling system. To receive the following services, the user has to first mark a date in advance. The scheduling in Poupatempo has to be done for the following services:
 Employee Records
 Services related with a Driver's License
 Emission of an Employment record book
 Emission of a Criminal Background Record.
 Emission of an ID Card
 Entrance into Unemployment benefits
 Services related to vehicles

External links

References 

Government of São Paulo (state)
São Paulo (state)